The whitespotted smooth-hound (Mustelus palumbes) is a houndshark of the family Triakidae. It is found on the continental shelves of the southeast Atlantic from Namibia around South Africa, between latitudes 17° S and 36° S, from the surface to a depth of 440 m. It can reach a length of 1.2 m. The reproduction of this houndshark is ovoviviparous.

References

 

whitespotted smooth-hound
Marine fish of South Africa
Marine fauna of Southern Africa
whitespotted smooth-hound